The 2006 Asian Junior Athletics Championships was the 12th edition of the international athletics competition for Asian under-20 athletes, organised by the Asian Athletics Association. It took place from 15–18 July at the Macau Stadium in Macau, China. A total of 43 events were contested, which were divided equally between male and female athletes aside from the men's 3000 metres steeplechase.

Medal summary

Men

Women

2006 Medal Table

References

Results
Asian Junior Championships 2006. World Junior Athletics History. Retrieved on 2013-10-16.

External links
Asian Athletics official website

Asian Junior Championships
Asian Junior Athletics Championships
Athletics in Macau
Asian Junior Athletics Championships
2006 in Asian sport
International sports competitions hosted by Macau
2006 in youth sport